Meirav Shamir (born 18 January 1988) is an Israeli footballer who plays as a goalkeeper. She has been a member of the Israel women's national football team.

Early life
Shamir was born in Netanya to a Jewish family. She grew up in the city of Netanya, until her family moved with her to the United States when she was two years old.

Shamir started playing soccer when she was just four years old  and as a young child her dream was "to play soccer collegiately and eventually play for the national team."

Professional soccer

Club career
After competing with the United States side at the 2009 Maccabiah Games, Shamir was approached by the staff of the national team about joining them in their campaign to qualify for the 2011 FIFA Women's World Cup. Shamir subsequently left Boston College to join the national team and complete her degree at Tel Aviv University while playing for ASA Tel Aviv domestically. After 3 years in ASA Tel Aviv, taking three top league Championships and Israeli Cup, Shamir joined Telstar of the Eredivisie (First League) in the Netherlands. After a successful two seasons with Telstar, Shamir made the move to Germany and signed with the 2nd Bundesliga club, 1. FC Lübars, also known as the club Hertha BSC.

By FC Lübars, Shamir had a successful season. Her first 10 games, Shamir kept the 0, beating Manuel Neuer's record with most games without conceding a goal. She finished the season with 15 clean sheets in 20 games, and helping Lübars finish in first place and win the league. Unfortunately, due to financial problems, FC Lübars could not move up to the first league.

Shamir signed with MSV Duisburg for the 2015–16. MSV also competes in the 2nd Bundesliga after being relegated from the 1st Bundesliga after the 2014–15 season.

International career
Shamir made her national team debut in a 1–0 win on 24 October 2009 in a 2011 FIFA Women's World Cup qualifying match against Kazakhstan in Ness Ziona.

Footnotes

External links
 
 
 Profile on the ASA Tel Aviv website (Hebrew)
 Profile on the Boston College website

1988 births
Living people
Footballers from Netanya
Israeli women's footballers
Women's association football goalkeepers
ASA Tel Aviv University players
Telstar (women's football club) players
MSV Duisburg (women) players
Ligat Nashim players
Eredivisie (women) players
Israel women's international footballers
Israeli expatriate women's footballers
Israeli expatriate sportspeople in the Netherlands
Expatriate women's footballers in the Netherlands
Israeli expatriate sportspeople in Germany
Jewish Israeli sportspeople
Jewish footballers
Jewish sportswomen
Israeli emigrants to the United States
Naturalized citizens of the United States
American women's soccer players
Boston College Eagles women's soccer players
American expatriate women's soccer players
American expatriate sportspeople in the Netherlands
American expatriate soccer players in Germany
Jewish American sportspeople
Maccabiah Games competitors for the United States
Maccabiah Games footballers
21st-century American Jews
21st-century American women